Xicalcoliuhqui (also referred to as a "step fret" or "stepped fret" design and greca in Spanish) is a common motif in Mesoamerican art. It is composed of three or more steps connected to a hook or spiral, reminiscent of a "greek-key" meander. Pre-Columbian examples may be found on everything from jewelry, masks, ceramics, sculpture, textiles and featherwork to painted murals, codices and architectural elements of buildings. The motif has been in continual use from the pre-Columbian era to the present.

Connotations
The word xicalcoliuhqui means "twisted gourd" (xical- "gourdbowl" and coliuhqui "twisted") in  Nahuatl. The motif is associated with many ideas, and is variously thought to depict water, waves, clouds, lightning, a serpent or serpent-deity like the mythological fire or feathered serpents, as well as more philosophical ideas like cyclical movement, or the life-giving connection between the light of the sun and the earth, and it may have been a protection against death, but no single meaning is universally accepted.  It is also possible that the motif represents the cut conch shell which is an emblem of Ehecatl, the wind god, an aspect of Quetzalcoatl. It seems likely that the multivalent nature of the symbol gave rise to its potency and longevity.

Xicalcoliuhqui chimalli, the stepped-fret shield
 Xicalcoliuhqui chimalli, are shields featuring a single iteration of the stepped fret motif which were painted or covered with featherwork. They are depicted frequently in the Codex Mendoza, and many other central Mexican codices, usually with the xicalcoliuhqui design shown in yellow and green.

Architectural embellishments
 The xicalcoliuhqui motif appears in embellishments on temples and other buildings at archaeological sites around Mexico.

 The xicalcoliuhqui motif is featured on either side of the staircase on The Pyramid of the Niches at the Veracruz site of El Tajín. 
 The stone mosaic fretwork at Mitla, a Zapotec site in Oaxaca, display many variations on the xicalcoliuhqui motif.

References

Gallery

Mesoamerican art
Pre-Columbian art
Indigenous art of the Americas
Visual motifs